Fabio Ribotta (born 3 December 1998 in Pinerolo, Italy) is an Italian curler, a , 2019 Italian men's champion.

Personal life
Ribotta works in the tire business.

Teams

References

External links
 
 Fabio Ribotta - Atleta - FISG - Federazione Italiana Sport del Ghiaccio  (curler profile - Italian Ice Sports Federation)
 Fabio Ribotta Archivi - FISG - Federazione Italiana Sport del Ghiaccio 
 Fabio Ribotta – OA Sport 
 Risultati della ricerca per “Fabio Ribotta” – Sporting Club Pinerolo 
 
 

Living people
1998 births
People from Pinerolo
Italian male curlers
Italian curling champions
Sportspeople from the Metropolitan City of Turin